Fabian Escapes is a children's picture book by Peter McCarty.  Published by Henry Holt & Co. in 2007, it is the sequel to the 2002 Caldecott Honor book Hondo & Fabian. This is a book about what happens when Fabian, the cat, leaves the house.

Reception
Kirkus Reviews wrote: "Children will enjoy the story’s gentle, rhythmic exploration of pet relationships." Publishers Weekly also wrote: "McCarty's parallel sentences and soft-focus pencil illustrations hint that Hondo and Fabian are too well-fed to stray. His characteristic pattern, one framed image and one sentence per spread, slows the pace. Yet the artist lends an enigmatic feline quality to Fabian's alert ears and confidently stiff tail, and a glimmer of mischief around Hondo's beady eyes and plush golden contours." The Horn Book wrote: "Part two in the parallel adventures of the cat and dog introduced in McCarty's Hondo and Fabian has the same low-key charm as the first volume."

See also
Hondo and Fabian

References

External links
Peter McCarty's web site
American picture books
Children's fiction books
2007 children's books
Henry Holt and Company books
Books about cats
Dogs in literature
Sequel books